Iraj Tanzifi (born 1317) was an Iranian scholar and sculptor.

Early life 
After receiving a guidance school degree, in Gorgan, he enrolled in high school. After two years, he received a diploma in teaching. In 1345 he was accepted in the field of sculpture, went to college, then switched to painting and achieved his optimum. Iraj also taught art with Moallemi. His classmates include Yadu'llah Derakhshani, Mohammadhosein Halimi and Jamaluddin Khorraminezhad.

Career 
He taught sculpture, and is the founder of modern sculpture by copper. He was labeled the expression of “Father of modern sculpture in Iran”. In 1385, he was a guest professor in Paris for three months. In addition to painting and sculpture, he was also a poet.

References

ِDaneshgaheGolestan
Golshanemehr
Blogdir
Oghan

Iranian sculptors